Raymond Damase Ngollo (25 March 1936, in Ngabe – 9 August 2017) was a Congolese General. He was a member of the Military Committee of the Congolese Labour Party which briefly ruled the Republic of Congo between 18 March 1977 and 3 April 1977. Ngollo das a Minister of Defence and founded the Rally for Democracy and Republic (RDR).

References

1936 births
2017 deaths
Government ministers of the Republic of the Congo
People from Pool Department
Republic of the Congo military personnel